Myripristis clarionensis, the yellow soldierfish, is a species of fish in the family Holocentridae found in the eastern Pacific Ocean, primarily concentrated around the Revillagigedo Islands and Clipperton Island. They are reef fish.

References

External links
 

clarionensis
Fish described in 1897